The Bay Building is a six-storey building on the corner of Granville Street and Georgia Street in downtown Vancouver, British Columbia, Canada. It is a flagship store of the Hudson's Bay department store chain. The cream terra cotta building with Corinthian columns was built in 1914, 1926, and 1927. The current store was built on the site of another HBC store from 1893. The last additions were made in 1949.

The original HBC store in Vancouver was a small storefront on Cordova between Carrall and Abbott.

On October 30, 2017, HBC announced plans to sell the building, although the store would continue operating in the location as it is under a long-term lease.

See also
 Hudson's Bay Queen Street - flagship in Toronto
 Hudson's Bay Montreal Downtown - flagship in Montreal

References

 HBC Vancouver
 HBC Granville store

Buildings and structures in Vancouver
Commercial buildings completed in 1927
Department store buildings in Canada
Hudson's Bay Company
Tourist attractions in Vancouver